Patrice Pellat-Finet (born 29 August 1952 in Villard-de-Lans) is a retired French alpine skier who competed in the 1976 Winter Olympics.

References

External links
 sports-reference.com

1952 births
Living people
French male alpine skiers
Olympic alpine skiers of France
Alpine skiers at the 1976 Winter Olympics
20th-century French people